This is a list of banks operating in Kosovo.

Central banks

Commercial banks
The banks operate in the official currency of Kosovo, the Euro.

Banks operating in the Serb-populated regions of Kosovo
The majority of Serbian banks previously licensed by the National Bank of Serbia to operate in Kosovo have been shut down. These banks previously operated in the official currency of Serbia, the Serbian dinar. Komercijalna Banka ad Beograd is now licensed through the Central Bank of Kosovo.

Disbanded banks

Notes

References

Kosovo
Banking in Kosovo
Banks
Kosovo